Thalpunoor is a small village in Wanaparthy district, Telangana, India, situated in between 16.406 degrees northern longitude and 78.242° eastern latitude.

Population stats
According to the 2021 census, total population was 2,991, male constitutes 1,520 and female 1,471, literacy is just above 67.13%.

Notes and references 

Villages in Wanaparthy district